Samuel Ato (born 29 April 1989 in Saltpond) is a Ghanaian football player who currently plays for Dunaújváros PASE.

References
Profile at HLSZ 
Profile at MLSZ 

1989 births
Living people
People from Central Region (Ghana)
Ghanaian footballers
Association football midfielders
Kaposvári Rákóczi FC players
Kaposvölgye VSC footballers
Győri ETO FC players
Kozármisleny SE footballers
Pécsi MFC players
Dunaújváros PASE players
Nemzeti Bajnokság I players
Ghanaian expatriate footballers
Expatriate footballers in Hungary
Ghanaian expatriate sportspeople in Hungary